The Brian Pillman Memorial Show was an annual professional wrestling event held between 1998 and 2001 benefiting the children of Brian Pillman and featuring talent from World Championship Wrestling (WCW), the World Wrestling Federation (WWF) and Extreme Championship Wrestling (ECW), as well as local and independent circuit performers. The proceeds for the event went to the future education of Pillman's children.

The match between Chris Benoit and Steven Regal at the 3rd Annual Brian Pillman Memorial Show was included on Benoit's 2004 DVD Hard Knocks: The Chris Benoit Story.

Show results

1st Annual Brian Pillman Memorial Show 
April 29, 1998 in Norwood, Ohio (Norwood Middle School)

2nd Annual Brian Pillman Memorial Show 
May 19, 1999 in Cincinnati, Ohio (Cincinnati Gardens)

3rd Annual Brian Pillman Memorial Show: Pillman 2000 
May 25, 2000 in Cincinnati, Ohio (Xavier University's Schmidt Field House)

4th Annual Brian Pillman Memorial Show 
August 9, 2001 in Cincinnati, Ohio (Oak Hills High School)

Notes

References 
 Pillman show postponed - Brian Pillman Memorial Event raises money for wrestler's family (June 2001)

Professional wrestling memorial shows
1998 in professional wrestling
1999 in professional wrestling
2000 in professional wrestling
2001 in professional wrestling
Events in Cincinnati
Professional wrestling in Cincinnati
Brian Pillman